Voom HD Networks is a suite of 25 original high-definition television channels owned by AMC Networks. The channels were produced in Crystal Clear Hi-Definition with Dolby Digital 5.1 Surround Sound and were the largest suite of HD channels in the world as part of a 15-year agreement between AMC Networks and Dish Network.

History
The Voom HD Networks were originally part of the Voom DTH satellite platform launched by Cablevision and were operated by its subsidiary, Rainbow DBS Company. The original Voom DTH was primed as a competitor to the established DirecTV and Dish Network systems, with its goal to become the first television provider with a lineup consisting mainly of high-definition TV networks. As part of this endeavor, Voom launched in 2003 twenty-one original channels that were completely in HD.

Service was broadcast via the Rainbow-1 communications satellite, which was built by Lockheed Martin and launched on July 17, 2003. It continues to operate from the 61.5°W orbital location, over the Atlantic Ocean.

Voom used the same unique 8PSK Turbo-coded modulation scheme as Dish Network but with a symbol rate of 22 MSPs 5/6 FEC versus Dish Network's 21.5 MSPS 2/3 FEC resulting in a data rate of 50.5 Mbit/s per transponder versus Dish Network's 41 Mpbs. Despite the same modulation scheme, Voom and Dish Network were incompatible given Voom's choice of conditional access and the system's standard. Dish Network uses Nagravision and DVB whereas Voom used Motorola's Digicipher II scrambling and system information.

Voom broadcasts their MPEG-2 video in either low-rate standard definition or medium-rate high definition. Many of their channels were encoded as 1440x1080i versus the 1920x1080i the ATSC system was designed for. Additionally, the video bit rate was often far below the 15 Mbit/s rates chosen for ATSC with its multiplex rate of 19.3 Mbit/s. This resulted in poor video quality both in SD and HD. Dolby AC-3 was the audio standard like all Digicipher-based networks.

In early 2005, Voom's parent company Cablevision announced it would seek "strategic alternatives" for Rainbow Media Enterprises. This business unit contained its Voom satellite service, leaving the future of Voom in question.  Cablevision's board proceeded to shut the Voom satellite service down: The satellite service ceased on April 30, 2005, and Rainbow-1 and VOOM's spectrum allocations were sold to EchoStar.

Work on the Voom HD channels continued.  In April 2005, Rainbow Media and Dish Network entered into a 15-year affiliation agreement whereby EchoStar's Dish Network obtained the right to distribute the Voom channels until 2020 and agreed that it would pay Rainbow Media monthly subscription fees for the life of the agreement.  The subscription fees started at $3.25 per subscriber in the first year of the contract and were to increase to $6.43 per subscriber by the year 2020. In a separate agreement, EchoStar's Dish obtained a 20% ownership interest in Rainbow Media (the business unit that contained the Voom  HD channels) and Rainbow agreed to invest $100 million into the Voom service each year for the first five years of the agreement. As a result, EchoStar's Dish Network announced that they would be adding ten of Voom's original 21 channels to their lineup starting May 1; the remaining channels were added on February 1, 2006.

Upon launch, the Voom HD channels were very well received and EchoStar's HD subscriber base expanded from about 20,000 at the end of 2005 to about 1.3 million at the end of 2007.

In addition to being carried by Dish Network, the HD channels were relaunched by Rainbow Media under the name "Voom HD Networks." Due to issues surrounding the formatting of the channels, fifteen of the 21 original channels were initially retained. Voom's HD collection was added to Cablevision's cable-TV HD lineup in late June 2007.

In January 2008, EchoStar's Dish Network abandoned the affiliation agreement claiming that Voom had failed to invest $100 million in the service during 2006 although Cablevision and Rainbow provided Dish Network with the financial statements documenting their compliance. Dish Network proceeded to remove ten of the channels from their lineup on May 12, 2008, with the remaining five removed the next day,

Following the litigation discovery process, the Court granted Voom's motion for discovery sanctions. The New York State Supreme Court found that EchoStar's Dish Network "systematically destroyed evidence" in the case and stated that “it is entirely possible that the documents destroyed by EchoStar demonstrated that EchoStar knew all along that there was no breach...and would prove Voom's case.” The Judge also stated that he would tell jurors that Dish Network destroyed evidence and that the jury may assume the evidence would have been helpful to Voom's case.

According to Sanford C. Bernstein analyst Craig Moffett in a recent Wall Street Journal article, "cases involving spoilation of evidence rarely go to trial because the odds are so skewed against the offending party." In this case, the judge would tell the jury that EchoStar failed to preserve certain evidence and bar Dish from calling its expert witness to testify on damages.

Additionally, the Court stated in its November 3, 2010 ruling: “In conclusion, the court notes EchoStar's pattern of egregious conduct and questionable – and, at times, blatantly improper – litigation tactics. EchoStar's spoliation in this action, and the fact that it has been sanctioned for spoliation in previous actions, is precisely the type of offensive conduct that cannot be tolerated by the court. Similarly egregious is EchoStar's last-minute finagling with expert reports, believing that it can play fast and loose with the rules of procedure to enhance its litigation posture.”

The trial commenced on September 19, 2012, in the New York State Supreme Court. During the summer of 2012, financial analysts who covered Dish Networks urged the company to settle the lawsuit in advance of the trial, as “the odds would...appear to be heavily in Cablevision's/AMC's favor.”

On October 21, 2012, Cablevision and AMC Networks announced they had settled their legal disputes with Dish Networks over Voom HD, an indirect subsidiary of AMC Networks. The dish was to pay a settlement of $700 million to Cablevision and AMC Networks, $80 million would go to the purchase of Cablevision's multichannel video and distribution licenses in 45 U.S. metropolitan areas.

Legacy

One of its channels, HDNews—managed by veteran news director, William Wright—was responsible for many HDTV firsts, including incorporating Emmy-Award–winning television journalist Zoey Tur's transmission codec which allowed the backhaul of news content via the Internet. Today Tur and HDNews's novel use of the Internet for high definition transmission of breaking news is now used by content creators across the globe.

The satellite which broadcast VOOM is currently still in orbit, incorporated into the Dish Network fleet after the demise of VOOM's satellite operations and rebranded as Echostar XII.

Unlike most discontinued direct broadcast satellite systems in the United States such as PrimeStar and AlphaStar, the Voom set-top boxes are still useful even though the service is gone; they can be used to receive ATSC digital broadcast signals. Voom set-top boxes have commanded prices upwards of $100 on websites such as eBay as people seek a less expensive way to receive digital off-air broadcasts.

Channels

Animania HD (cartoons & animated programming)
Auction HD (televised auctions)
Epics ("A cinematic celebration of the silver screen with magnificent stories and music, all about heroes, noble journeys and the triumphant human spirit."; only non-HD channel)
Equator HD (exotic & unique locations & international cultures)
Gallery HD (physical art & the artistic process)
GamePlay HD (programming dedicated to playing video games, such as tips, tricks, cheats, hidden levels & items, Easter eggs, etc.)
HDNews (high definition news; formerly Voom News Bytes HD)
LAB HD (non-narrative video art & experimental film)
Monsters HD (horror, sci-fi)
Rave HD (music)
Rush HD (extreme sports)
Treasure HD (collections, collectors, & collecting)
Ultra HD (hottest fashion, coolest styles, & insights into the luxury life)
Voom HD Movies (classic & current Hollywood blockbusters)
World Sport HD (international sports)

And it's suite of 10 HD movie channels, HD Cinema 10:

Divine HD (LGBT)
Family Room HD (family-friendly)
Film Fest HD (independent movies & documentaries)
Gunslingers HD (westerns)
Guy TV HD (male-oriented)
Ha Ha HD (comedy)
Kung Fu HD (kung-fu, martial arts, & Japanese anime)
The Majestic HD (pre-1970s films in black & white & Technicolor)
Vice HD (law enforcement)
World Cinema HD (global classics, award-winners, and foreign films)

Voom programming worldwide

Canada
In 2005, Rainbow Media signed a licensing and programming deal with Canadian company High Fidelity HDTV allowing them to air programming from the Voom HD Networks on their own channels and use of the Voom brand and branding of several of their channels. So far, High Fidelity HDTV has launched 4 channels with three having had the same names as their Voom counterparts, before the brandings were changed:

Smithsonian Channel (initially the Canadian version of Equator HD)
Love Nature  (initially Oasis HD)
BBC Earth (initially the Canadian version of Rush HD)
BBC First (initially the Canadian version of Treasure HD)

Singapore

Latin America
Voom HD is launched in Latin America on April 28, 2009, in Brasil was launched in SKY Brasil and TVA cable service (São Paulo and Rio de Janeiro); it is replaced by Rush HD on August 1, 2009, which ceased broadcast in spring 2011. On the continent the channel was distributed by DLA Inc. (Digital Latin America Inc.). On September 12, 2011, as launched Voom HD Latin America.

References

External links
 

Defunct television broadcasting companies of the United States
AMC Networks
Direct broadcast satellite services
Television channels and stations established in 2003
Television channels and stations disestablished in 2009